Bertoki is a settlement in the City Municipality of Koper in the Littoral region of Slovenia.

The parish church in the settlement is dedicated to the Assumption of the Virgin.

References

External links
Bertoki at Geopedia

Populated places in the City Municipality of Koper
Slovenian Riviera